Eric Hutchinson is an American singer-songwriter.

Eric Hutchinson may also refer to:

Eric Hutchinson (rugby union) (1916–1942), rugby union player who represented Australia
Eric Hutchinson (politician), member for the Division of Lyons in the Australian House of Representatives from 2013 to 2016

See also
Eric Hutchison (disambiguation)